Aldrith Ivana Quintero Humphries (born 1 January 2002) is a Panamanian professional footballer who plays as a midfielder for Spanish Liga F club Alhama CF and the Panama women's national team.

International career
Quintero appeared in five matches for Panama at the 2018 CONCACAF Women's Championship.

International goals

See also
 List of Panama women's international footballers

References

External links 
 Aldrith Ivana Quintero at the 2019 Pan American Games

2002 births
Living people
Women's association football midfielders
Panamanian women's footballers
Segunda Federación (women) players
Panama women's international footballers
Pan American Games competitors for Panama
Footballers at the 2019 Pan American Games
Panamanian expatriate women's footballers
Panamanian expatriate sportspeople in Spain
Expatriate women's footballers in Spain